Pyrrhopygopsis is a Neotropical genus of grass skippers in the family Hesperiidae.

Species

Pyrrhopygopsis agaricon Druce, 1908
P. agaricon agaricon Colombia
P. agaricon nanta Evans, 1955 Ecuador
Pyrrhopygopsis quispica (Plötz, 1886) Peru, Bolivia
Pyrrhopygopsis romula (Druce, 1875)
P. romula romula Colombia
P. romula lugubris Druce, 1908 Bolivia
P. romula tenebricosa (Hewitson, 1876) Peru
Pyrrhopygopsis socrates (Ménétriés, 1855)
P. socrates socrates Brazil, Paraguay, Trinidad
P. socrates crates Mabille & Boullet, 1912  Bolivia, Ecuador, Peru
P. socrates orasus (Druce, 1876) Peru, Colombia

References

Natural History Museum Lepidoptera genus database

External links
images representing Pyrrhopygopsis at Consortium for the Barcode of Life

Hesperiinae
Hesperiidae of South America
Hesperiidae genera
Taxa named by Frederick DuCane Godman